This is the timeline of the three longest man-made spans in the world, all categories, that at least have the strength to carry some persons. It can be the span of any type of bridge, aerial tramway, power line, structural ceiling or dome etc.

Overview 
In this timeline, only spans that were still standing in a particular year are considered for that year. This is perhaps more fair than a timeline of the records of all time, because the old figures might be incorrect. At the points when the old spans fall, new spans with more certain figures are allowed to appear in the timeline. This is a top-three list of existing longest spans per day.

When several structures of the same length exist, the oldest is counted as the longest.

Some more rules for this timeline follow as: Only the length of the horizontal projection of the span, that is, the distance that can be measured on a map, counts. When the two supports have different heights above the sea level, the distance between them is longer than the horizontal projection of the distance, but this longer distance isn't counted. This is because it is more difficult to build a  horizontal span than a 100 m span that is tilted perhaps 45 degrees, as if it was the support for an escalator. The stress in the material is higher for the horizontal span, creating higher engineering difficulty, so only the length of the span perpendicular to the force of gravity is counted. For many structures in the timeline, it is not known if the stated length is the desired horizontal projected length, or the direct "laser beam" length.

Spanning structures in water are included only if they would still be standing if the water were removed.

The longest  Ameralik Span and others have pylons that are not completely man-made. The lines are attached to small man-made pylons that in turn stand on the mountain, which forms the rest of the height of the pylons required for a span of that length. If the present man-made pylons were placed in a flat area, there would be no span, because the lines would touch the ground. It could be argued that this span should not appear in the timeline because the pylons are not completely man-made. However, as the focus of the engineering design task here is not to make something that is tall, but to make something that is long, it is concluded that this type of span is enough man-made to be in this timeline.

The spans of ancient structures are short. It would have been easy for somebody to tie a long rope between two poles and in this way create a very long ancient span. However, the ancient people had no reason to do this, and if they did, it is not documented and therefore not in this timeline. Only with the discovery of electricity and radio communication did people have a reason for tying a wire between two poles, thus creating the simplest form of long spans.

The span of the Pantheon, Rome, is not 43.3 m because there is a hole at the top of 9.1 m, so the span has been reduced with the size of the hole to 34.2 m. The span of any structure is measured in the following way: Place the largest possible imaginary horizontal circular disk under or inside the structure, barely touching any load-bearing pillars or walls, or parts used to stabilize the structure like wires. The disk must also not encircle any objects of this kind. At least one diameter of the disk have to be completely covered, that is rain-sheltered, by the structure. The span of the structure is diameter of the disk. Now, if the structure contains a hole at the center of the disk, as in the case of the Pantheon, the span is measured by using a second-largest possible imaginary horizontal circular disk that is smaller than the first disk and completely encircled by it. At least one diameter of the second disk has to be completely covered by the structure. The span of the structure is diameter of the second disk. Applying this method of measurement to Pantheon gives the previously stated result, 34.2 m. The method works for many types of structures.

Note: almost all information in this timeline has uncertainty.

Longest spans 1813–present

Longest spans 62 BC–1813

Known incorrect construction years 
In the timeline above, some completion years are given which are known to be incorrect.  The following guesses were used to generate the graphic, but should not be taken as definitive.

See also 
 List of spans
 List of longest suspension bridge spans
 List of longest cantilever bridges
 Arch bridge

References

External links 
 http://www.bridgemeister.com/index.htm
 http://en.structurae.de/index.cfm
 
 Port-Sainte-Marie Bridge http://www.bridgemeister.com/bridge.php?bid=1765
 Philadelphia Footbridge http://www.bridgemeister.com/bridge.php?bid=20
 https://web.archive.org/web/20080625153254/http://www.bhutanstudies.org.bt/admin/pubFiles/Chakzampa.pdf   Chakzam/Iron Bridge p78, Tashigang Bridge p94, Phuntsholing Bridge p69
 :pt:Ponte do Porto, http://en.structurae.de/structures/data/index.cfm?id=s0020363

Spans (architecture)
Lists of construction records
Spans, three longest